An overlord in the English feudal system was a lord of a manor who had subinfeudated a particular manor, estate or fee, to a tenant.

Overlord may also refer to:

History
 Operation Overlord, codename for the invasion of Normandy by Allied forces during World War II
 Overlord system, popular name for structure of British government 1951–1953

Arts and entertainment

Film and television
 Overlord (1975 film), a 1975 black and white film directed by Stuart Cooper
 Robot Overlords (2014 film), a British science fiction film
 Overlord (2018 film), a horror film
 Overlord, villains in the animated TV series Blackstar
 "Over Lord", an alternate name for "Invasion of the Capital", an episode of the TV series RahXephon
 Overlord (anime), a Japanese anime series

Fiction
 Overlord (comics), a comic-book supervillain created by Erik Larsen
 Overlord (novel series), a Japanese light novel series
 Overlord (Transformers), a robot supervillain character in the Transformers robot superhero franchise.
 Overlord (G.I. Joe), a fictional villain in the G.I. Joe universe
 Overlords, an alien-demon/Satan species in the 1953 science fiction book Childhood's End by Arthur C. Clarke

Video gaming

 Overlord (1990 video game), a 1990 strategy computer game
 Overlord (1994 video game), a World War II flight simulator for the Amiga and PC by Rowan Software
 Overlord (video game series), an action/adventure video game series by Codemasters
 Overlord (2007 video game), an action/adventure game for the PC, PlayStation 3, and Xbox 360
 Overlord: Raising Hell, an expansion to the 2007 game
 Overlord II, sequel to the 2007 game
 Overlord: Dark Legend, for the Nintendo Wii
 Overlord: Minions, for the Nintendo DS
 Overlord: Fellowship of Evil, a spin-off released in 2015
 Mass Effect 2: Overlord, a 2010 downloadable content pack for the video game Mass Effect 2

Other entertainment
 Overlord (band), a Brooklyn-based indie pop band led by George Pasles
 "Overlord", a song by Black Label Society from the album Order of the Black
 Ariakon Overlord, a paintball pistol
 Overlord: D-Day and the Battle for Normandy, a history book by Max Hastings

Other uses
 Mount Overlord, an extinct volcano in Antarctica
 Overlord Mountain, a mountain in British Columbia, Canada
 Overlord meme, an Internet meme relating to mock submission
 Overlord, a software project managed by Red Hat for JBoss Fuse Service Works